Edusei is a Ghanaian surname. Notable people with the surname include:

Kevin John Edusei (born 1976), German conductor
Daniel Edusei (born 1980), Ghanaian footballer
Mark Edusei (born 1976), Ghanaian footballer
Akwasi Fobi-Edusei (born 1986), English footballer

Ghanaian surnames